Halo (also known as Halo: The Series) is an American military science fiction television series developed by Kyle Killen and Steven Kane for the streaming service Paramount+, based on the video game franchise of the same name. Produced by Showtime Networks, 343 Industries, Amblin Television, One Big Picture, and Chapter Eleven, the series follows a 26th-century war between the United Nations Space Command and the Covenant, a theocratic-military alliance of several advanced alien races determined to eradicate the human race.

Pablo Schreiber and Jen Taylor star as Master Chief Petty Officer John-117 and Cortana, with the latter reprising her role from the video game series, and are joined by Shabana Azmi, Natasha Culzac, Olive Gray, Yerin Ha, Bentley Kalu, Kate Kennedy, Charlie Murphy, Danny Sapani, Bokeem Woodbine, and Natascha McElhone. Development for a television series began in 2013. Killen was hired in June 2018, and the series officially announced a nine-episode order for Paramount+. Filming began in Ontario, Canada in October 2019, although post-production for the first five episodes was affected due to the COVID-19 pandemic. Filming eventually resumed in Budapest, Hungary, in February 2021.

Halo premiered on March 24, 2022, on Paramount+, with the series already renewed for a second season. The first season was met with mixed reviews, with praise aimed towards its action scenes, cast, and visual effects but criticism for its derivative writing and alterations from the source material.

Premise
Halo follows "an epic 26th-century conflict between humanity and an alien threat known as the Covenant. Halo will weave deeply drawn personal stories with action, adventure and a richly imagined vision of the future."

Executive producer Kiki Wolfkill revealed that the series is a standalone story that takes place within its own "Silver Timeline" that is separate from and inspired by the core canon and lore of the transmedia franchise rather than a continuation, adaptation, prequel, or sequel, explaining that they wished to give the two Halo canons a chance to evolve individually to suit their media. This decision has been compared to how Marvel Studios has adapted the Marvel Comics into the Marvel Cinematic Universe.

Cast

Main 
 Pablo Schreiber as Master Chief Petty Officer John-117, a towering genetically engineered supersoldier known as "Spartan-117".
 Logan Shearer plays a teenage John-117
 Casper Knopf plays a child John
 Shabana Azmi as Admiral Margaret Parangosky, Director of ONI (Office of Naval Intelligence)
 Natasha Culzac as Riz-028, a Spartan member of Silver Team
 Olive Gray as Commander Miranda Keyes, a UNSC (United Nations Space Command) officer and scientist and the daughter of Jacob Keyes and Catherine Halsey
 Yerin Ha as Kwan Ha, an Insurrectionist teenager from the outer colony planet of Madrigal
 Bentley Kalu as Vannak-134, a Spartan member of Silver Team
 Kate Kennedy as Kai-125, a Spartan member of Silver Team
 Charlie Murphy as Makee (season 1), a misanthropic human member of the Covenant who was raised by the Hierarchs as a "Blessed One".
 Zazie Hayhurst plays a young Makee
 Danny Sapani as Captain Jacob Keyes, a seasoned UNSC officer
 Jen Taylor as Cortana, an artificial intelligence (AI) construct modeled on the brain of Dr. Halsey and implanted in the brain of Master Chief as a means of influencing his decisions. Taylor reprises her voice role from the Halo video game series and provides motion capture for the character.
 Bokeem Woodbine as Soren-066, a Spartan deserter who later became an Insurrectionist leader on the Rubble
Jude Cudjoe plays a teenage Soren-066
 Natascha McElhone as Dr. Catherine Elizabeth Halsey, a scientist for the UNSC and creator of the Spartan-II Project
McElhone also portrays two flash clones of Halsey
 Fiona O’Shaughnessy as Laera (season 2; guest season 1); Soren's wife
 Tylan Bailey as Kessler (season 2; guest season 1); Soren's son
Joseph Morgan as James Ackerson (season 2), a formidable intelligence operative who has spent his career climbing the ranks of the UNSC’s secretive Office of Naval Intelligence.
 Cristina Rodlo as Talia Perez (season 2), a corporal specializing in linguistics for a UNSC Marine Corp communications unit.

Recurring
 Burn Gorman as Vinsher Grath, a politician and UNSC collaborator who suppresses the Insurrectionist movement on Madrigal
 Ryan McParland as Dr. Adun Saly (season 1), Dr. Halsey's assistant
 Sarah Ridgeway as John's Mother
 Duncan Pow as John's Father
 Julian Bleach as the voice of the Prophet of Mercy, one of the Hierarchs

Guest
 Jamie Beamish as the motion capture model of the Kaidon, the Covenant Elite survivor of the Battle of Madrigal
 Keir Dullea as Fleet Admiral Lord Terrence Hood, a high-ranking UNSC officer 
 Jeong-hwan Kong as Jin Ha, Kwan's father and an Insurrectionist leader on Madrigal

Episodes

Production

Development
The television series had gone through development hell with a planned release in 2015 that later changed to a 2019 release with Rupert Wyatt as director and executive producer, then a 2020 release; ultimately releasing in 2022 with Otto Bathurst replacing Wyatt in both roles.

On May 21, 2013, Steven Spielberg was attached in executive producing a television series based on the video game franchise Halo, distributed by Xbox Entertainment Studios, with Spielberg's company Amblin Television involved. As of August 2015, the series had still been in active development.

On June 28, 2018, Showtime was given a 10-episode series order. Kyle Killen was set to be showrunner, writer and executive producer, while Rupert Wyatt was attached as director and executive producer. On August 12, it was announced that Master Chief would be the main lead of the series and that the series would tell a new story from the video games while respecting their canon at the same time. On December 3, Wyatt stepped down as director and EP due to scheduling conflicts. He was replaced by Otto Bathurst in February 2019, when it was reported that Bathurst would be directing the pilot along with several other episodes. It was also revealed that the episode count had decreased from 10 episodes to 9. In March 2019, Steven Kane was added as co-showrunner alongside Killen. 

On February 24, 2021, the series was moved from Showtime to Paramount+. Showtime president Gary Levine said that the show was an outlier for the company's brand, and as a "big broad tentpole show" it was a better fit on Paramount's service. On June 25, 2021, it was reported that both Kane and Killen would be exiting as showrunners following the completion of season one. Killen had left prior to the start of production, due to him feeling like he wasn't able to fulfill the duties of showrunner, with Kane taking the reins as lead showrunner until post-production work had been completed. However, should the show get picked up for a second season, Kane would not return. 

In January 2022, it was revealed by executive producer Justin Falvey that the show has potential to last multiple seasons and that David Wiener was being eyed as the showrunner for a potential season two, with Kane staying on board as a consultant. On February 15, 2022, ahead of its premiere, Paramount+ renewed the series for a second season, with Wiener set as showrunner and executive producer.

Casting 
From April–August 2019, the cast for the series was announced, with Pablo Schreiber as Master Chief. He was joined by Yerin Ha, Natascha McElhone, Bokeem Woodbine, Shabana Azmi, Bentley Kalu, Natasha Culzac and Kate Kennedy. In November 2020, Jen Taylor replaced McElhone as Cortana. In September 2022, Joseph Morgan and Cristina Rodlo joined the cast, while Fiona O’Shaughnessy and Tylan Bailey were promoted to series regulars for the second season.

Filming 
Principal photography commenced in October 2019. In 2019, the series spent over $40 million on production costs. The five filmed episodes were re-edited under the COVID-19 pandemic shutdown, with production on the sixth episode and reshoots being planned in Ontario, Canada. Filming eventually resumed fully in Budapest, Hungary in February 2021. The total production of the series including the post-production is estimated to cost between $90–200 million for the first season. Filming for the second season began on September 15, 2022 in Iceland, with the additional country Hungary (Budapest) to be occurred filming later in that year.

Music 
On February 14, 2022, it was announced that Sean Callery would compose the score for the series.

Release

Marketing 
The first trailer for the series debuted online during the 2022 AFC Championship Game, while also revealing the March release date. Tie-in content themed around the series was released for Halo Infinite on May 10, 2022 in the form of in-game cosmetics for the game's multiplayer component.

Broadcast 
The first two episodes premiered ahead of release on March 14 at the 2022 SXSW Film Festival. The series then debuted on Paramount+ on March 24, 2022. The first episode set a record as Paramount+'s most-watched series premiere globally in its first 24 hours, though no exact viewership numbers were revealed. The first season overall was the second-most watched original series for Paramount+ as of June, 2022.

In the United Kingdom, the first episode of the series premiered on Channel 5 on June 22, 2022 to promote the launch of the Paramount+ streaming service in that country.

Home media 
The first season of Halo was released digitally on November 7, 2022, and on 4K UHD Blu-ray, standard Blu-ray, and DVD on November 15, 2022.

Reception 

The first season currently holds an approval rating of 70% based on 70 reviews on Rotten Tomatoes, with an average rating of 6.7/10. The website's critics consensus reads, "Halo is too derivative of better science-fiction series to emerge a fully-formed elite, but glimmers of promise and faithfulness to the source material signal it's not out of the fight just yet." On Metacritic, the show has a weighted average score of 61 out of 100 based on 20 critic reviews, indicating "generally favorable reviews".

Jesse Schedeen of IGN, rated the first season a 7/10, saying, "[it] is by no means a perfect adaptation of the beloved source material." However he later backed it up with, "This is an adaptation willing to take some risks, and those risks tend to pay off." Gene Park from The Washington Post criticized the writing behind Kwan Ha and described the sex scene between the Master Chief and Makee in the penultimate episode of the first season as "rushed." He stated that the series "has its greatest successes in vignettes of exciting tense and well-acted, well-directed drama, but rarely ever earning those best moments within the context of all it’s trying to juggle." Todd Martens from The Los Angeles Times criticized the script for shifting from a character-driven narrative to a plot-driven one. Martens also felt that the series sacrificed some of the "silliness" from the games.

Master Chief has been described as acting out of character compared to his core canon counterpart, and Kwan Ha, an original character created for the Silver Timeline canon, has received negative reception due to her story being perceived as too "disjointed" and "divorced" from the main plotline of the series and the Halo universe.

The sex scene between the Master Chief/John and Makee, another original character created for the Silver Timeline canon, in the eighth episode of the first season has received a polarized reaction from audiences and critics; discussions included whether the scene was "contrived and forced", whether the Master Chief had committed a war crime by having sex with a prisoner of war who was unable to properly provide her consent, and whether this was considered as atypical behavior of the Master Chief in comparison to the core canon (this was the first time John has had sex in either the core or Silver canons). Kiki Wolfkill, the studio head of transmedia at 343 Industries and an executive producer of the show, defended the addition of the scene, stating that while the creative team had "a lot of conversation leading up to whether to do that or not and... there's a lot of different opinions and voices", that the scene was necessary in order to humanize John by providing him with "a human connection with someone" in order to end the season with him as "a fully defined character".

Marcus Lehto, one of the co-creators of the first Halo game, stated that the show is "not the Halo I made", but later stated that he "never said [he] didn't like it".

References

External links
 
 Halo at Amblin
 

2020s American drama television series
2020s American science fiction television series
2022 American television series debuts
American action adventure television series
American television shows based on video games
English-language television shows
Military science fiction television series
Live action television shows based on video games
Paramount+ original programming
Television series about alien visitations
Television series by Amblin Entertainment
Television series set in the 26th century
Television shows filmed in Hungary
Works based on Halo (franchise)